Zuzwil may refer to:

 Zuzwil, Bern
 Zuzwil, St. Gallen